John Stewart Sholto Douglas, 22nd Earl of Morton (born 17 January 1952) is a Scottish peer and landowner.

Known as Stewart, Douglas is the son of John Douglas, 21st Earl of Morton and Mary Sheila Gibbs.  He succeeded to the earldom in 2016, upon the death of his father.

He married Amanda Kirsten Mitchell, daughter of David John Macfarlane Mitchell, and has three children.

Stewart's daughter is Olympic rower Katherine Douglas.

References

1952 births
Living people
Earls of Morton
Scottish landowners
Place of birth missing (living people)